Pęcławice may refer to the following places in Poland:

Pęcławice
Kolonia Pęcławice
Pęcławice Górne